Craig Harvey Thiele (born 14 November 1953) is a former New Zealand cricketer. He has played 34 first-class cricket matches and 25 List A matches for Canterbury cricket team between 1980 and 1987.

References

External links 
 

1953 births
Living people
New Zealand cricketers
Canterbury cricketers
Cricketers from Nelson, New Zealand
South Island cricketers